Fall, Once Again is the second extended play (EP) by South Korean singer Kyuhyun. It was released on October 15, 2015, by S.M. Entertainment and distributed by KT Music. The EP featured seven tracks in total, including the lead single, "A Million Pieces".

Background
Kyuhyun established himself as the crown prince of ballads through his first solo album At Gwanghwamun, which swept music, album and music video charts, as well as music programs, when it was released in November 2014. Crowned the vocalist of fall with "At Gwanghwamun", Kyuhyun's second solo album Fall, Once Again garnered interest as one of the most-anticipated albums of the season.

Fall, Once Again was released at midnight on 15 October 2015, and was expected "to blow through the fall season like a gust of wind once again."

Production and composition
"A Million Pieces" was written by Kenzie and the song compares a precious love to stars in the night sky to stimulate the fans' sense of fall; the classical and classy melody harmonized well with Kyuhyun's sweet voice. "A Million Pieces" is a seasonal ballad that features a refined melody and emotional lyrics brought to life by Kyuhyun's captivating voice.

Promotion

Release
Ahead of the album release, Kyuhyun released a surprise comeback promo clip parodying a famous commercial that was debuted through Naver Starcast at noon on 8 October 2015. F(x) member Amber produced and appeared in the comical clip to support Kyuhyun in his comeback, further heightening anticipation for his upcoming album.

On 15 October 2015, the "A Million Pieces" music video was released through Kyuhyun's official website and SMTOWN's YouTube channel. It captured the viewer's attention with the film-like quality.

Live performance
Kyuhyun kicked off his comeback and performed his lead single "A Million Pieces" for the first time on the Korean music show M! Countdown on 15 October 2015.

Solo concert
Kyuhyun's solo concert was held at the SMTOWN COEX Artium SMTOWN Theatre from November 6–8 and November 13–15, for a total of six shows.

Track listing

Charts

Release history

References

External links
 Kyuhyun's official website 
 
 
 
 

Cho Kyuhyun EPs
2015 EPs
Korean-language EPs
SM Entertainment EPs